Paartha Gnabagam Illayo is a 1985 Indian Tamil language drama film directed by veteran actor, comedian Nagesh. The film stars Anand Babu, Ramya Krishnan and Radharavi in lead roles. The soundtrack album was composed by M. S. Viswanathan.

Plot 

Twin sisters Kasthuri and Lalitha (Ramya Krishnan) are separated at a very young age where Kasthuri was raised by (Radha Ravi) who had greed for money and a lavish lifestyle. He planned to marry Kasthuri to a rich old man even after knowing that she was in love with Rathnam (Anand Babu). Meanwhile, Lalitha is married to her dream man and lives happily with him. Rathnam coincidentally meets Lalitha and mistakes her for Kasthuri. Resolving Confusions and reuniting the two sisters form the crux of the story.

Cast

Anand Babu as Rathnam
Ramya Krishnan as Kasthuri / Lalitha
Radha Ravi 
Rajeev 
Thengai Srinivasan 
R. S. Manohar

References 

1980s Tamil-language films
1985 films
Indian drama films
Twins in Indian films